Amir Syafiz bin Abdul Rashid (born 21 June 2004) is a Singaporean footballer currently playing as a midfielder for Young Lions.

Career statistics

Club

Notes

International statistics

U19 International caps

U19 International goals
Scores and results list Singapore's goal tally first.

U16 International caps

U16 International goals

References

2004 births
Living people
Singaporean footballers
Association football midfielders
Singapore Premier League players
Young Lions FC players